Albert Zohmingmawia (born 9 January 1991) is an Indian professional footballer who plays as a midfielder for Aizawl in the I-League.

Career
Born in Mizoram, Zohmingmawia played for Aizawl in the I-League 2nd Division and Mizoram Premier League. He was also a part of the Mizoram side that won the football competition during the 2015 National Games.

Zohmingmawia made his professional debut for Aizawl in the I-League on 9 January 2016 against the reigning champions, Mohun Bagan. He played the full match as Aizawl lost 3–1.

I-League statistics

References

External links 
 ZoFooty Profile.

1991 births
Living people
Indian footballers
Aizawl FC players
Association football midfielders
Footballers from Mizoram
I-League 2nd Division players
I-League players